The Dark Tower: The Drawing of the Three - Lady of Shadows is a five-issue comic book limited series published by Marvel Comics. It is the thirteenth comic book miniseries based on Stephen King's The Dark Tower series of novels. It is plotted by Robin Furth, scripted by Peter David, and illustrated by Jonathan Marks and Lee Loughridge, with covers by Nimit Malavia. Stephen King is the Creative and Executive Director of the project. The first issue was published on September 2, 2015.

Publication dates
Issue #1: September 2, 2015
Issue #2: October 7, 2015
Issue #3: November 18, 2015
Issue #4: December 16, 2015
Issue #5: January 20, 2016

Collected editions
The entire five-issue run of Lady of Shadows was collected into a paperback edition, released by Marvel on March 29, 2016.

See also
The Dark Tower (comics)

References

External links

Dark Tower Official Site

2015 comics debuts
Drawing of the Three - Lady of Shadows, The